At the 1924 Winter Olympics, in Chamonix, France, a military patrol competition was held. The Olympic results database lists the official medal winners for the event, as does the Official Report (1924), yet several sources have incorrectly counted this competition as a demonstration event only. The event was also demonstrated in 1928, 1936, and 1948, but those results are still considered unofficial. A full 36 years would pass before the modern version of the sport, biathlon, became an official Winter Olympic sport. The official website of the IOC now treats Men's Military Patrol at the 1924 Games as a separate discipline, without mixing it with the sports of Skiing or Biathlon. However, the 1924 Official Report treats it as an event within the sport of skiing.

The competition was held on Tuesday, January 29, 1924. Each team had 4 people and the distance was 25 km. The targets were balloons at 150m. Six teams started the event, but only four finished with Italy and Poland withdrawing due to bad conditions.

Results

Participating nations
A total of 24 biathletes from six nations competed at the Chamonix Games:

Medal table 
Sources:

References

Bibliography
Official Report (1924) of both Summer and Winter games:

External links
 International Olympic Committee results database
 

1924 Winter Olympics events
1924
1924 in biathlon
1924 in cross-country skiing
1924 in military history
Men's events at the 1924 Winter Olympics